The 2021 Northern Ireland Open, referred to as the BetVictor Northern Ireland Open for sponsorship purposes, was a professional ranking snooker tournament that took place from 9 to 17 October 2021 at the Waterfront Hall in Belfast, Northern Ireland. It was the third ranking event of the 2021–22 season and the first tournament in both the Home Nations Series and the European Series. It was the sixth edition of the Northern Ireland Open.

Qualifying for the tournament took place from 23 to 27 August 2021 at the Morningside Arena in Leicester, England, although matches involving the top 16 players, and three other matches featuring Northern Irish players, were held over and played at the Waterfront Hall. All of the top 16 players participated except for world number 9 Ding Junhui. Mark Allen made a maximum break in his held over qualifying match against Si Jiahui.

The defending champion was Judd Trump, who defeated Ronnie O'Sullivan in the 2018, 2019 and 2020 finals by a scoreline of 9–7 each time. Trump lost 3–5 in the quarter-finals to Allen, having led 3–0.

Allen faced John Higgins in the final, which was tied at 4–4 after the afternoon session. Higgins moved 8–6 ahead in the evening session, but Allen won the last three frames for a 9–8 victory. It was Allen's first Northern Ireland Open title, his second Home Nations win, and the sixth ranking title of his professional career.

Format

The Northern Ireland Open was first played in 2016, and was won by Mark King. The 2021 event was the first of four Home Nations Series events, and the third world ranking tournament of the 2019–20 snooker season. The event took place from 9 to 17 October 2021 at the Waterfront Hall in Belfast, Northern Ireland. The event followed the British Open, and preceded the English Open.

The defending champion was Judd Trump, who defeated Ronnie O'Sullivan in the 2018, 2019 and 2020 finals by a scoreline of 9–7 each time. All matches were played as the best of 7  in the first four rounds, at which point the number increased: 9 in the quarter-finals; 11 in the semi-finals; and the best of 19 frames in the final. Sports betting company BetVictor sponsored the event, which was broadcast in Europe by Eurosport; CCTV, Rigour, Liaoning TV in China; NowTV in Hong Kong; Astro SuperSports in Malaysia and Brunei; True Vision in Thailand; Sky Sports in New Zealand and Matchroom Sport in all other territories.

Prize fund
The breakdown of prize money for this event is shown below:

 Winner: £70,000
 Runner-up: £30,000
 Semi-final: £20,000
 Quarter-final: £10,000
 Last 16: £7,500
 Last 32: £4,000
 Last 64: £3,000
 Highest break: £5,000
 Total: £405,000

Main draw 
The results from the event are shown below. Seeded players have their seedings in brackets. Players highlighted in bold denote match winners.

Top half

Bottom half

Final

Qualifying 
Qualification for the tournament took place from 23 to 27 August 2021 at the Morningside Arena in Leicester, England. Matches involving the top 16 players — including the defending champion — alongside three other matches involving local players, were held over and played at the Waterfront Hall. Graeme Dott, Anthony Hamilton, Mark Davis and Robbie McGuigan were due to take part in the event, but withdrew and were replaced by James Cahill, Dylan Emery, Mark Lloyd and Robert McCullough respectively.

 (1) 4–1 
 0–4  
 (32) 3–4 
 2–4 
 (16) 2–4  
 2–4 
 4–2 
 2–4 
 2–4 
 (24) 3–4 
 2–4 
 (9) 4–1  
 4–1 
 (25) 4–1 
 1–4 
 (8) 4–2  
 (5) 4–2  
 2–4 
 (28) 3–4 
 3–4 
 (12) 4–1  
 1–4  
 (21) 4–3 
 4–2 
 3–4 
 (20) 3–4 
 4–2 
 (13) 4–3  
 4–2 
 (29) 4–1 
 2–4 
 (4) 4–0  
 (3) 4–0  
 2–4 
 (30) 1–4 
 4–1 
 (14) 4–0  
 3–4 
 (19) 2–4 
 0–4 
 4–2 
 (22) 4–1 
 2–4 
 (11) 4–1  
 1–4 
 (27) 4–3 
 4–0 
 (6) 4–0  
 (7) 4–2  
 3–4 
 (26) 4–1 
 4–0 
 (10) 4–1  
 3–4 
 (23) 4–2 
 2–4 
 0–4 
 (18) 4–0 
 3–4 
 (15) 3–4  
 4–0 
 (31) 4–0  
 3–4 
 (2) 4–1

Notes

Century breaks

Main stage centuries

Total: 50

 136, 123, 121, 113, 113, 110, 105  John Higgins
 135  Noppon Saengkham
 133, 128, 101, 100  Mark Allen
 132, 129  Stuart Bingham
 129  Ronnie O'Sullivan
 128, 111, 101  Gary Wilson
 128  Fan Zhengyi
 127, 120  Kyren Wilson
 127, 115, 110, 108  David Gilbert
 127  Alfie Burden
 127  Louis Heathcote
 123, 106, 102  Jimmy Robertson
 121, 109  Ricky Walden
 117  Cao Yupeng
 115  Oliver Lines
 114  Jak Jones
 113  Liang Wenbo
 113  Matthew Stevens
 110, 106, 103, 102  Shaun Murphy
 110  Mark King
 106  Jack Lisowski
 106  Tian Pengfei
 102, 100  Mark Williams
 102  Neil Robertson
 100, 100  Judd Trump
 100  Yan Bingtao

Qualifying stage centuries

Total: 29

 147  Mark Allen
 137  Jack Lisowski
 137  Anthony McGill
 137  Chris Wakelin
 125  Soheil Vahedi
 122, 121  Yan Bingtao
 120  Ronnie O'Sullivan
 117, 100  Mitchell Mann
 117  Oliver Lines
 116, 108  David Gilbert
 113  Joe Perry
 112, 101  Mark Selby
 112  Jak Jones
 111  Matthew Stevens
 111  Thepchaiya Un-Nooh
 110  Martin Gould
 109  Mark Williams
 108  Noppon Saengkham
 107  Craig Steadman
 105  Wu Yize
 104  James Cahill
 104  Duane Jones
 104  Liang Wenbo
 101  Lyu Haotian
 100  Tian Pengfei

References 

Home Nations Series
2021
Northern Ireland Open
October 2021 sports events in the United Kingdom
Sport in Belfast
Snooker competitions in Northern Ireland
European Series